Clambus is a genus of minute beetles in the family Clambidae. There are at least 30 described species in Clambus.

Species
These 32 species belong to the genus Clambus:

 Clambus aegrepilosus Endrödy-Younga, 1960 g
 Clambus arizonicus Endrödy-Younga, 1981 i c g
 Clambus armadillo (De Geer, 1774) i c g b
 Clambus arnetti Endrödy-Younga, 1981 i c g
 Clambus besucheti Endrody-Younga, 1974 g
 Clambus caucasus Endrody-Younga, 1960 g
 Clambus cilicicus Sahlberg, 1913 g
 Clambus dux Endrödy-Younga, 1960 g
 Clambus evae Endrödy-Younga, 1960 g
 Clambus felix Endrody-Younga, 1960 g
 Clambus filii Endrödy-Younga, 1960 g
 Clambus formosanus g
 Clambus gibbulus (LeConte, 1850) i c g
 Clambus gibbus Endrody-Younga, 1986 g
 Clambus hayekae Endrödy-Younga, 1960 g
 Clambus helheimricus Alekseev, 2017 g
 Clambus howdeni Endrödy-Younga, 1981 i c g b
 Clambus klapperichi Endrody-Younga, 1986 g
 Clambus minutus (Sturm, 1807) g
 Clambus nigrellus Reitter, 1914 g
 Clambus nigriclavis Stephens, 1835 g
 Clambus octobris Endrödy-Younga, 1959 i c g
 Clambus pallidulus Reitter, 1911 g
 Clambus pilosellus Reitter, 1876 g
 Clambus pubescens Redtenbacher, 1849 i c g b
 Clambus punctulum (Beck, 1817) g
 Clambus seminulum Horn, 1880 i c g
 Clambus simsoni Blackburn, 1902 g
 Clambus smetanai Endrödy-Younga, 1981 i c g
 Clambus spangleri Endrödy-Younga, 1981 i c g
 Clambus tuberculatus Endrody-Younga, 1986 g
 Clambus vulneratus LeConte, 1879 i c g

Data sources: i = ITIS, c = Catalogue of Life, g = GBIF, b = Bugguide.net

References

Further reading

External links

 

Scirtoidea
Articles created by Qbugbot